Per-Ragnar Bergkvist (born 11 April 1976) is a Swedish former professional ice hockey player who played in the Swedish Hockey League (SHL). Bergkvist was drafted in the fifth round of the 1996 NHL Entry Draft by the Philadelphia Flyers, but he never played professionally in North America. He spent most of his professional career in Sweden, playing four seasons in the SHL with Leksands IF and Färjestad BK.

References

External links

1976 births
Living people
Färjestad BK players
Leksands IF players
People from Falun
Philadelphia Flyers draft picks
Swedish ice hockey goaltenders
Vålerenga Ishockey players
Sportspeople from Dalarna County